Carlo Alberto dalla Chiesa  (27 September 1920 – 3 September 1982) was an Italian general, notable for campaigning against terrorism during the Years of Lead. He was assassinated by the Sicilian Mafia in Palermo.

Biography
Born in Saluzzo, Cuneo, he became commandant of the (military) region of Piemonte-Valle d'Aosta in 1974 and created an anti-terrorism structure in Turin, which succeeded in capturing in September 1974 Red Brigades members Renato Curcio and Alberto Franceschini, with the help of Silvano Girotto, also known as Frate Mitra ("Friar Machine Gun"), who infiltrated the organisation.

In the foreword of the Argentine National Commission on the Disappearance of Persons report on the Argentine Dirty War, dalla Chiesa was cited as having rejected the use of torture in Italy in response to the kidnapping of Aldo Moro, the former prime minister killed by the Red Brigades in 1978. In response to a suggestion that torture be used in the investigation, dalla Chiesa stated, "Italy can survive the loss of Aldo Moro. It would not survive the introduction of torture."

Assassination

On 1 May 1982, dalla Chiesa was appointed as prefect for Palermo to stop the violence of the Second Mafia War. He was murdered in Palermo on 3 September 1982, on the orders of Mafia boss Salvatore Riina. He and his second wife Emanuela Setti Carraro were in an Autobianchi A112 driven by her, when a number of gunmen on motorbikes and a car forced the car off the road where it crashed into a stationary vehicle. The gunmen opened fire and dalla Chiesa was killed along with his wife and their escort agent, Domenico Russo.

The lead killer was Pino Greco, who was later convicted in absentia of the crime at the Maxi Trial. A number of other gunmen were involved, including Giuseppe Lucchese, who was also sentenced to life imprisonment for the crime at the Maxi Trial. Bernardo Provenzano, Salvatore Riina, Giuseppe Calò, Bernardo Brusca, Francesco Madonia, Nenè Geraci and Francesco Spadaro were later also sentenced to life imprisonment in absentia.

Dalla Chiesa was also investigating the death of Mauro De Mauro, a journalist who had himself been investigating the murder of Enrico Mattei, head of Agip, the Italian oil company.

Personal life

His son Nando, who is a sociology professor at the University of Milan and former member of Parliament, is the president honoris causa of the anti-Mafia organisation Libera founded by Luigi Ciotti, while his daughters Rita and Simona are respectively a TV presenter and a journalist.

See also 
Cento giorni a Palermo
List of victims of the Sicilian Mafia
Il Capo dei Capi

References

External links
 Sentenza primo grado omicidio dalla Chiesa 

Italian generals
People murdered by the Corleonesi
Antimafia
1920 births
1982 deaths
Recipients of the Silver Medal of Military Valor
People from Saluzzo
Carabinieri
Male murder victims
Assassinated police officers
Italian police officers
People murdered in Italy
Knights of Malta
Knights of the Holy Sepulchre